The POP3 Connector is a piece of software included with Small Business Server (SBS) versions of Microsoft Exchange Server that enables the server to fetch e-mail from external, 3rd party, POP3 servers.

Description
The software can fetch e-mail on a per-user, per-account basis, or it can fetch e-mail from a catch-all account and distribute by the To: field based on the e-mail addresses assigned to users in Active Directory. Note that the latter method does not work for bcc'd e-mails and some mailing lists, as the recipient cannot be easily identified by looking at the e-mail headers. However, failed e-mail can be delivered to a central account, where the correct recipient can be identified manually and then distributed accordingly by the administrator.

The software is then scheduled to fetch e-mail at regular intervals, from once every 24 hours right down to once every 5 minutes (SBS 2008). If the situation requires it, an immediate download can be started from the configuration screen.

There are non-supported workarounds to shorten the fetch interval, such as on SBS 2003 creating the new DWORD value ScheduleAccelerator in the registry folder "HKLM\SOFTWARE\Microsoft\SmallBusinessServer\Network\POP3 Connector". The new fetch interval time becomes the amount specified in the configuration GUI, divided by the value set for ScheduleAccelerator. For example, if the user sets the interval in the GUI to 15 minutes, and the ScheduleAccelerator value is set to 3, it will fetch e-mail every 5 minutes. In SBS 2008 the program Pop3Connector.exe in "%programfiles%\Windows Small Business Server\Bin" can fetch e-mail instantly by using the argument -downloadNow. Using this command with Task Scheduler allows the user specify a fetch interval that suits their needs.

Alternatives 

Other commercial alternatives are available that can be utilised for any version of Microsoft Exchange (or any RFC compliant SMTP server for that matter). These products typically provide increased functionality such as more frequent checking times (e.g.: once per minute) advanced logging and alerting, antispam/antivirus functionality, aliasing and content filtering.  Free, open-source alternatives also exist.

See also
 Windows Server 2003
 Microsoft Servers
 Fetchmail

External links 
 Slipstick - Connecting Exchange to a Pop3 Account
 MSExchange.org - List of 3rd party Pop3 Connectors

Microsoft software
Windows Server System
Message transfer agents